Wej Sports Club, is a Saudi Arabian football club based in Al Hawiyah, Ta'if, that plays in the Saudi First Division, the second tier of the Saudi Arabian football league system, formed in 1976.

On 26 February 2016, Wej promoted to the Saudi First Division for the first time in their history after beating Al-Badaya 1–0 on aggregate in the play-off of Saudi Second Division.

Current squad 
As of 3 January 2019:

Honours
Saudi Second Division
Third place (1): 2015–16
Saudi Third Division
Third place (1): 2013–14

References

Football clubs in Saudi Arabia
Association football clubs established in 1976
1976 establishments in Saudi Arabia
Football clubs in Ta'if